Anna Wilhelmine Gmeyner (16 March 1902 – 3 January 1991) was an exiled German and Austrian writer, playwright and screenwriter, who is now best known for her novel Manja (1939). She also wrote under the names Anna Reiner, and Anna Morduch. Her daughter was the children's writer Eva Ibbotson.

Early life

Anna Gmeyner was born to liberal Jewish parents in Vienna, where her father Rudolf Gmeyner was a lawyer. She grew up in a sophisticated and intellectual household, and her parents counted Sigmund Freud among their friends. Having studied in Vienna from 1920, Gmeyner moved to Berlin in 1925. She married Bertold Wiesner, a controversial physician who pioneered human infertility treatment, who recently found that he was actually the father of maybe one thousand of the children his clinic in London helped to be conceived. Their only child, Eva (born Maria Charlotte Michell Wiesner), was born shortly before the move. The family relocated to Scotland in 1926 after Wiesner was offered a job at the University of Edinburgh, it was during this time that Gmeyner gathered inspiration for her play about the Scottish miners' strike.

Gmeyner and Wiesner separated in 1928, and Gmeyner returned to Berlin where she began to write plays. Her first theatrical works were a children's play called The Great and Little Claus and a critically acclaimed drama about the miners' strike in Scotland.

Life in exile

The Nazis' rise to power in 1933 prompted Gmeyner to flee Berlin, where her work was later banned. She moved to Paris, and began to work in film production, working with Bertolt Brecht and writing film scripts for G. W. Pabst. It was in Paris that Gmeyner met her second husband, the Russian philosopher Jascha Morduch.

As war approached, the couple moved to England, where Gmeyner began work on the exile literature she became known for. In 1938 she wrote Manja while living with Morduch and her daughter, Eva, in Belsize Park, London. The novel draws on the experience of exile, and this period of Gmeyner's life is evoked by Eva in the novel The Morning Gift. Manja was published first in Amsterdam in 1939, before being published in English as Five Destinies in the US, and The Wall in the UK. Manja was republished by Persephone Books in 2003.

Between 1940 and 1950, Gmeyner and her husband lived in Berkshire. Jascha Morduch died in 1950, and Gmeyner began writing again under the name Anna Morduch, publishing biographies, religious stories, and poetry, as well as novels.

Anna Gmeyner died in York, England in 1991 at the age of 88.

Bibliography 
 
  Re-issued by Persephone Books in 2003, with a foreword by Gmeyner's daughter Iva Ibbotson.

References

External links 
 [http://www.reference-global.com/doi/abs/10.1515/9783484971486.467 What's in a Name? What is Jewishness?, Deborah Vietor-Engländer
 Author Profile at Persephone Books
 Manja at Persephone Books

1902 births
1991 deaths
Writers from Vienna
Jewish Austrian writers
Austrian women writers
20th-century novelists
Jewish emigrants from Nazi Germany to the United Kingdom